Palpita seitzialis is a moth in the family Crambidae. It was described by Hering in 1903. It is found in Brazil (Santos).

References

Moths described in 1903
Palpita
Moths of South America